The short Samoan tree snail, Samoana abbreviata, is a species of tropical, air-breathing, land snail, a terrestrial, pulmonate, gastropod mollusk in the family Partulidae.

Description
The length of the shell attains 22.6 mm.

Distribution
This species is endemic to American Samoa.

References

 Gerlach J. (2016). Icons of evolution: Pacific Island tree-snails of the family Partulidae. Phelsuma Press. .

Samoana
Invertebrates of American Samoa
Molluscs of Oceania
Critically endangered fauna of Oceania
Taxonomy articles created by Polbot